Ralph Frederick Manheim (April 4, 1907 – September 26, 1992) was a Jewish-American translator of German and French literature, as well as occasional works from Dutch, Polish and Hungarian. He was one of the most acclaimed translators of the 20th century, and likened translation to acting, the role being "to impersonate his author".

Early life
Manheim was born in New York City. He lived for a year in Germany and Austria as an adolescent, graduated from Harvard at the age of 19, and spent time in Munich and Vienna (studying at the universities) before Adolf Hitler’s rise to power. He also undertook post-graduate study at Yale and Columbia universities.

Career
His career as a translator began with Hitler's Mein Kampf, commissioned by Houghton Mifflin and published in 1943. Manheim endeavored to give an exact English equivalent of Hitler's highly individual, often awkward style, including his grammatical errors.

Manheim translated the works of Bertolt Brecht (in collaboration with John Willett), Louis-Ferdinand Céline, Günter Grass, Peter Handke,  philosopher Martin Heidegger, Hermann Hesse, Novalis, and many others. His translation of Henry Corbin's work Alone with the Alone: Creative Imagination in the Sufism of Ibn 'Arabi could be considered a major contribution towards the understanding of Ibn Arabi's and Sufi philosophy in the English-speaking world.

In 1961, he rendered transcripts of the trial in Jerusalem of Adolf Eichmann into English, and Grimm's Tales For Young and Old – The Complete Stories, published in 1977. Modern readers are familiar with his 1986 translation of E.T.A. Hoffmann's "The Nutcracker and the Mouse King". It was published with illustrations by Maurice Sendak, in conjunction with the release of the 1986 film Nutcracker: The Motion Picture. Lovers of children's books also admire his agile translation of Michael Ende's The Neverending Story.

Later life and death
Manheim moved to Paris in 1950 and lived there until 1985, when he moved with his fourth wife to Cambridge, England. He died in 1992, at age 85, from complications associated with prostate cancer.

Selected translations
 The History of the Maghrib: an Interpretive Essay by Abdallah Laroui
 Mein Kampf by Adolf Hitler
 Journey to the End of the Night by Louis-Ferdinand Celine
 Castle to Castle by Louis-Ferdinand Celine
 Death on the Installment Plan by Louis-Ferdinand Celine
 The Tin Drum by Gunter Grass
 Cat and Mouse by Gunter Grass
 The Rat by Gunter Grass
 Grimm's Tales for Young and Old - The Complete Stories
 The Neverending Story by Michael Ende
 The Nutcracker and the Mouse King by E.T.A. Hoffmann
 Efraim's Book by Alfred Andersch
 The Good Person of Szechwan by Bertolt Brecht
 Baal by Bertolt Brecht
 The Threepenny Opera by Bertolt Brecht and Kurt Weill
 The Freud/Jung Letters
Knulp by Hermann Hesse
Crisis: Pages From a Diary by Hermann Hesse
 Reflections by Hermann Hesse
 From Lenin to Stalin by Victor Serge
 A Sorrow Beyond Dreams by Peter Handke
 The Guiltless by Hermann Broch
 The Left-Handed Woman by Peter Handke

Awards and honors

Manheim received the PEN Translation Prize in 1964.

He received the 1970 National Book Award in the Translation category for the first U.S. edition of Céline's Castle to Castle.

He was awarded a 1983 MacArthur Fellowship in Literary Studies. He won the PEN/Ralph Manheim Medal for Translation, a major lifetime achievement award in the field of translation, in 1988.

Manheim's 1961 translation of Günter Grass's Die Blechtrommel (The Tin Drum) was elected to fourth place among outstanding translations of the previous half century by the Translators Association of the Society of Authors on the occasion of their 50th anniversary in 2008.

References

See also 
Mein Kampf in English

American translators
French–English translators
German–English translators
Harvard University alumni
Columbia University alumni
Yale University alumni
MacArthur Fellows
National Book Award winners
Writers from New York City
1907 births
1992 deaths
20th-century translators
Mein Kampf
American expatriates in France